Hafeez Sorab Contractor (born 1950) is an Indian architect. He has designed many skyscrapers in India, primarily in the city of Mumbai. As of 2019, he is the architect of the three tallest buildings in India - The 42 in Kolkata, and the twin towers of The Imperial in Mumbai. He was awarded the Padma Bhushan in January 2016 by the Government of India.

Early life
Hafeez Contractor was born in Mumbai on 19 June 1950 into a Parsi family. He attended  Boys' Town Public School Nasik before moving on to the University of Mumbai's Academy of Architecture in 1975. He then won a scholarship to Columbia University, where he completed his master's degree.

Career

While pursuing his architecture degree, Contractor began working in 1968 as an apprentice under the supervision of his uncle and mentor Tehmasp Khareghat. He joined his uncle's company T. Khareghat in 1977 as an associate partner.

In 1991, Contractor was enlisted to add buildings to Infosys' Bangalore campus.  He went on to design that firm's first software-development park outside Pune, and its corporate educational facility near Mysore. His most famous project is Hiranandani Gardens, a township in Powai, a suburb of Mumbai. In 2005, Contractor designed the twin-tower residential skyscraper, The Imperial, whose 254 metre-tall Tower I became the tallest residential buildings in India (with Tower II slightly behind) upon completion in 2010 - a distinction it held until it was displaced by One Avighna Park (266 metre) in 2017. That building was, in turn, displaced by The 42 in Kolkata, which was also designed by Contractor and architecturally topped out at 260m. He also designed 23 Marina in Dubai, which was briefly the world's tallest all-residential building, and is currently third behind the nearby Princess Tower and 432 Park Avenue in New York City.

Contractor's other projects include the domestic terminal at Mumbai's Chhatrapati Shivaji Airport and the DY Patil Stadium, which serves as the home stadium for both the Mumbai Indians cricket team and Mumbai City FC football team. He also designed the Turbhe railway station in Navi Mumbai and in 2018 offered to 19 railway stations for free. He was the architect for Chief Minister of Telangana’s  official residence, Pragathi Bhavan completed in November 2016. He has been assigned to design the campus of Indian Institute of Petroleum & Energy, Visakhapatnam. An interview of his was published in the official  Class 8 english book.

Architectural style
Contractor has referred to the standardized ratings used in Western countries for certifying green buildings as a "joke". In his view, conditions in India require a rating system that takes into account the unique problems faced by that country, such as the loss of farmland.

In a New York Times profile he was described as Bollywood's "Starchitect". The article described Contractor's style as having "no signature, save a penchant for glitz." Contractor said of his own work, "[Y]ou definitely like a woman with lipstick, rouge, eyelashes. So if you make your building more beautiful with some appliqués, there’s nothing wrong."

List of works

Gallery

Awards and recognition
 2016: Hafeez was awarded India's third highest civilian award, the Padma Bhushan, in 2016.

References

External links

Book: Architect Hafeez Contractor: Select works (1982-2005)

Architecture firms of India
1950 births
Living people
Artists from Mumbai
Columbia Graduate School of Architecture, Planning and Preservation alumni
University of Mumbai alumni
20th-century Indian architects
Recipients of the Padma Bhushan in other fields
Parsi people from Mumbai